Fired Up is the fourth studio album by American country music artist Randy Houser. It was released on March 11, 2016 via Stoney Creek.  The lead single, "We Went", was released to radio on May 18, 2015 and became Houser's third Number One hit on the Billboard Country Airplay chart. "Song Number 7" and "Chasing Down a Good Time" were released as the album's second and third singles, respectively, in 2016.

Reception

Commercial
The album debuted on the Billboard 200 at No. 15, and no 3 on the Top Country Albums chart, selling 21,000 in the first week.  The album has sold 53,400 copies in the US as of July 2016.

Track listing

Personnel
David Angell- violin
Monisa Angell- viola
Dave Cohen- keyboards
David Davidson- violin
Derek George- banjo, acoustic guitar, electric guitar, programming, background vocals
Larry Hall- string arrangements
Lee Hendricks- bass guitar
Wes Hightower- background vocals
Alicia Hoffman- programming
Randy Houser- lead vocals
Jeff King- electric guitar
Troy Lancaster- electric guitar
B. James Lowry- acoustic guitar
Rob McNelley- electric guitar
Kevin Murphy- drums
Steve Nathan- keyboards
Sari Reist- cello
Michael Rhodes- bass guitar
Jeff Roach- keyboards
Scotty Sanders- steel guitar
Chris Stapleton- background vocals
Russell Terrell- background vocals
John Henry Trinko- keyboards
Lonnie Wilson- drums
Casey Wood- keyboards, percussion

Charts

Weekly charts

Year-end charts

References

2016 albums
Randy Houser albums
BBR Music Group albums
Albums produced by Derek George